Controsesso, internationally released as Countersex, is a 1964 Italian anthology comedy film directed by Franco Rossi, Marco Ferreri and Renato Castellani. All the episodes have sex as main theme. The episode of Ferreri is considered by several critics as the masterpiece of the first Italian period of the director.

Cast

Cocaina di domenica 
 Nino Manfredi: Sandro Cioffi
 Anna Maria Ferrero: Marcella
 Renzo Marignano: boyfriend of Sandro's sister

(directed by Franco Rossi, written by Cesare Zavattini, Piero De Bernardi and Leonardo Benvenuti)

Il professore 
 Ugo Tognazzi: The professor
 Elvira Paoloni: The grandmother

(directed by Marco Ferreri, written by Rafael Azcona and Marco Ferreri)

Una donna d'affari 
 Nino Manfredi: Andrea Spadini
 Dolores Wettach: Giovanna
 Umberto D'Orsi: Armando

(directed by Renato Castellani, written by Tonino Guerra and Giorgio Salvioni)

References

External links

1964 films
Commedia all'italiana
Films directed by Marco Ferreri
Films directed by Franco Rossi
Films directed by Renato Castellani
Films scored by Piero Umiliani
Italian anthology films
1964 comedy films
Films with screenplays by Rafael Azcona
1960s Italian films